Nordic combined at the 1988 Winter Olympics consisted of two events, held from 23 February to 28 February. The ski jumping portion took place at Canada Olympic Park, while the cross-country portion took place at Canmore Nordic Centre.

The Calgary Games saw two substantial changes in the Nordic combined program. A team event was added, marking the first time that more than one medal would be awarded in Nordic combined. The combined events also changed their format, replacing the points-based system used in previous years with the Gundersen method, in which ski jumping points totals were translated to time gaps for a pursuit cross-country race. This change ensured that the first competitor across the finish line in the cross-country race was the overall Olympic champion.

Medal summary

Medal table

Switzerland topped the medal table with two, one gold. Austria's two medals were the country's first in the sport.

Events

Participating NOCs

Thirteen nations participated in Nordic combined at the Calgary Games.

References

 
1988 Winter Olympics events
1988
1988 in Nordic combined
Nordic combined competitions in Canada
Men's events at the 1988 Winter Olympics